George of Hungary ( 1422–1502) was an Ottoman slave that escaped and reverted from Islam to Christianity, writing afterwards about his experiences. As per his own description, when George was 15 or 16, he was taken prisoner and sold into slavery when the Ottoman Turks invaded the town of Mühlbach (now Sebeș) in 1438. George had arrived to the city a year earlier, probably to go to a school in the local Dominican monastery.

He would spend 20 years being a slave before he could escape, later becoming a monk in Rome. Here, he wrote Tractatus de moribus, condicionibus et nequitia Turcorum ("Treatise on the morals, customs
and treachery of the Turks"), published in 1481 in Latin. In 1539 it was translated in German language along with a preface by Martin Luther.

The ethnicity of George is not known, possibly being either a German or a Hungarian. It is thought that he grew up in a bilingual environment and did not have a clear concept of his national identity. After his escape, George began to radically condemn and reject Islam.

See also  

 Konstantin Mihailović (born in 1430) Escapee slave of the Ottoman Empire who wrote slave narratives
 Johann (Hans) Schiltberger (1380 – c. 1440) Escapee slave of the Ottoman Empire who wrote slave narratives
 Emily Ruete, author who wrote narrative about slave mother's captivity.
Ex-Muslims
List of former Muslims
List of converts to Christianity from Islam
Margaret Himfi
Lovisa von Burghausen

Bibliography 

 An English Translation of Georgius de Hungaria's Treatise on the Customs, Living Conditions, and Wickedness of the Turks (1481) ~ Stevenson, David Ryan    (2016) etd.library.emory.edu
 Christian Slaves of the Ottoman Empire: An analysis of the fifteenth-century captive lives and writings of Konstantin Mihailović, Johan Schiltberger and Brother George of Mühlenbach ~ Patrick Smith (BA Honours) La Trobe University  Victoria, Australia August 2020
 Williams, Stephen Christopher  (1991) "Cronica der Turckey" Sebastian Franck's Translation of the "Tractatus de Moribus, Condicionibus et Nequitia Turcorum" by Georgius de Hungaria.    PhD thesis, University of Leeds.
 Christian-Muslim Relations. A Bibliographical History. Volume 7 Central and Eastern Europe, Asia, Africa and South America (1500-1600): Volume 7. Central and Eastern Europe, Asia, Africa and South America (1500-1600). Netherlands, Brill, 2015.

References 

Slaves from the Ottoman Empire
People who wrote slave narratives
Converts to Roman Catholicism from Islam
Turkish escapees
15th-century Hungarian people
15th-century German people
Year of birth uncertain
1502 deaths